Pachypodol is a chemical compound classified as an O-methylated flavonol. It can be isolated from a variety of plants including Calycopteris floribunda, Pogostemon cablin, and Croton ciliatoglanduliferus.

References 

O-methylated flavonols